Pinalia elata is a species of orchid found in Peninsular Malaysia.

References

elata